Eryma is a genus of fossil lobster-like crustaceans, containing 44 species.

References

External links

Glypheidea
Jurassic crustaceans
Prehistoric arthropods of North America